Newcastle Jets Football Club is an Australian professional association football club based in Newcastle, New South Wales. The club was formed in 2000 as Newcastle United, and played their first competitive match in October 2000, when they entered the First Round of the 2000–01 National Soccer League. The club was renamed Newcastle Jets in 2004. Since playing their first competitive match, over 200 players have made a competitive first-team appearance for the club, of whom 14 players have made at least 100 appearances (including substitute appearances).

Newcastle Jets' record appearance-maker is Jason Hoffman, who has made a total of 214 appearances over a current 11-year playing career. Ben Kantarovski holds the record for the most starts, having started in 176 matches. Joel Griffiths is the club's top goalscorer with 61 goals in his 6 years with the club. Labinot Haliti's 46 substitute appearances for the side is a club record.

Key
 The list is ordered first by date of debut, and then if necessary in alphabetical order.
 Appearances as a substitute are included.
 Statistics are correct up to and including the match played on 1 January 2023. Where a player left the club permanently after this date, his statistics are updated to his date of leaving.

Players

Players highlighted in bold are still actively playing at Perth Glory

Captains

References

External links
 Official Newcastle Jets website

Newcastle Jets FC players
Lists of soccer players by club in Australia
Association football player non-biographical articles